Ciqikou station may refer to:
Ciqikou station (Beijing Subway), a station on the Beijing Subway
Ciqikou station (Chongqing Rail Transit), a station on the Chongqing Rail Transit